.357 may refer to:

.357 Magnum, a firearm cartridge (revolver)
.357 SIG, a firearm cartridge (pistol)
.357 Maximum, a wildcat firearm cartridge (revolver)
.357/44 Bain & Davis, a wildcat firearm cartridge (pistol)
.357 Peterbilt, a wildcat firearm cartridge (pistol)
.357 Super Magnum, a wildcat firearm cartridge (revolver)

See also
.38 caliber
9 mm caliber